The Nera Verzasca, also known as the Nera di Verzasca or Verzaschese, is an indigenous breed of black domestic goat from the Valle Verzasca, in the canton of Ticino in southern Switzerland, from which it takes its name. It is raised in that area and in the provinces of Como, Varese and Verbano Cusio Ossola in northern Lombardy, in the north of Italy.

Numbers

In Italy, the Verzaschese is one of the forty-three autochthonous goat breeds of limited distribution for which a herdbook is kept by the Associazione Nazionale della Pastorizia, the Italian national association of sheep- and goat-breeders. In Switzerland the Nera Verzasca is among the endangered breeds for which a herdbook is kept by the Schweizerischer Ziegenzuchtverband or Federazione svizzera d'allevamento caprino, the Swiss federation of cantonal goat breeders' associations.

Use

The average milk yield per lactation of the Nera Verzasca was measured in 2003 at  litres for primiparous,  litres for secondiparous, and  litres for pluriparous, nannies; a study in 2008–10 found an average yield of  litres in 208 days, with an average of 3.50% fat and 3.06% protein. In Italy the milk is used to make caprino cheeses such as Formaggella del Luinese, which has DOP status, while in Switzerland much of it is made into Büscion, a fresh goat's-milk cheese; ricotta is made in both areas. 

References

Goat breeds
Dairy goat breeds
Goat breeds originating in Italy
Goat breeds originating in Switzerland
Meat goat breeds